Dard (Pain) is a 1947 Bollywood drama film directed by Abdul Rashid Kardar. The film was produced by Kardar Productions. It was a surprise "musical hit" at the box office as it had an ordinary (for then) star cast. Suraiya played the second lead, with Munawwar Sultana as the main heroine. The film was Suraiya's first "big hit", becoming a popular singing star following the success of the film. The hero of the film was Kardar's brother Nusrat (Kardar), who shifted to Pakistan following Partition in 1947, where he acted in a few films.

The music director was Naushad who composed the "hit" songs for the film, which continue to remain popular. The lyricist was Shakeel Badayuni, an "accomplished Urdu poet" who had arrived in Mumbai in 1946, to write songs for Hindi films. He was signed by Naushad and Kardar to write the lyrics for Dard. His "Afsana Likh Rahi Hoon" (I Am Writing A Tale) sung by Uma Devi went on to become successful as did the other songs from the film.

Dard was a Muslim social romantic melodrama which involved a love triangle in the form of two girls, Munnawwar Sultana and Suraiya, both in love with a doctor played by Nusrat.

Plot
Nawab Sahib (Badri Prasad) lives with his wife, the Begum (Pratima Devi) and their young daughter Suraiya (Munawwar Sultana). While attending a function at an orphanage, he becomes impressed by a student, Iqbal (Nusrat) and brings him home. After some initial friction Suraiya and the boy become friends. Iqbal grows up to become a doctor while Suraiya falls in love with him. She gifts him a big diamond ring. A friend (Husn Banu) of Suraiya's takes great pleasure in teasing the two, which Suraiya doesn't mind but is frowned upon by Iqbal.

Iqbal decides to serve at a village where there is an outbreak of plague. Here he meets Hamida (Suraiya) and the two fall in love in-between his ministrations to the sick. One of the villagers, Dilawar (Shyam Kumar), is a suitor of Hamida and jealous of the love interest between Hamida and Iqbal. Dilawar blackmails Iqbal about their romance, threatening to inform Nawab Sahib unless Iqbal gives him Rs. 10, 000. A scared Iqbal gives Dilawar the diamond ring gifted to him by Suraiya. Iqbal falls ill and the Nawab arrives with an ambulance to take him home. Hamida's father is killed by Dilawar, who then proceeds to lie to Hamida, telling her that Iqbal had left the ring for her and gives it to her. Hamida accepts it and wears it on her finger.

Hamida is taken in by the Nawab who brings her back to his house. Misunderstandings arise between Iqbal and Hamida when he sees the ring. The two however get back together again with their differences resolved.. Suraiya in the meanwhile shows symptoms of consumption, with coughing and fever. A marriage is arranged between her and Iqbal. Suraiya finds out about their love and she sacrifices her love for the two and dies.

Cast
Munawwar Sultana as Suraiya, Nawab Sahib's daughter and in love with Iqbal
Suraiya as Hamida, a village girl who falls in love with Dr. Iqbal 
Nusrat as Dr. Iqbal
Shyam Kumar as the village bad-guy Dilawar
Badri Prasad as the benevolent wealthy Nawab Sahib
Husn Banu as Suraiya's friend Zubeidaa
Pratima Devi as Nawab's wife, Begum

Review and reception
The film was released on 8 October 1948, at the Novelty Theatre, Bombay. The film was reviewed by Baburao Patel in his December 1948 issue of the cine-magazine Filmindia who claimed it to be a "total washout" calling it an "idiotic and boring picture". The production values were stated to be poor with dialogue delivery of the actors especially Nusrat being pitiable. The film's music, which turned out to be the main reason for the film's success, was critiqued by Patel as "The music in this picture is just damn unattractive and Naushad seems to have become a spent force. What else can one expect from a man who works in half-a-dozen pictures simultaneously?". He ended with, "It has neither music nor entertainment and it is terrifically boring. It is a grave risk for the exhibitor to book this picture on a minimum guarantee".

Music
The film was a big musical hit which catapulted the music director Naushad to great heights, and promoted the career of Shakeel Badayuni, who wrote the lyrics of the hit songs. Dard had music composed by Naushad. According to Bharatan, Naushad was accorded recognition for "Urdu-oriented classicality" in his music composition for Shahjehan (1946) and Dard by Indian Film Journalists' Association, Mysore with a Special Award in 1948.

Suraiya "dominated" the film with "soulful" rendition of her songs like "Beech Bhanwar Mein Aan Phansa Hai" in Raga Darbari, "Dil Dhadke Aankh Meri Phadke" and "Hum thay Tumhare Tum Thay Humare". All of her songs became a "hit" with the audiences. Suraiya's duet with Uma Devi, "Betaab Hai Dil" is counted as one of her top twenty songs.

Shamshad Begum had become extremely popular in the three years following Anmol Ghadi (1946), singing under Naushad's direction. One of her popular songs for Naushad from Dard was "Hum Dard Ka Afsana". Her other popular song from the film was "Yeh Afsana Nahin Zalim".

Uma Devi, later to become famous as the comedian Tun Tun, was a Naushad discovery. She came to the Hindi film industry to become an actress, Naushad gave her some classic songs to sing in Dard, which continue to remain popular. He later advised her to try her luck as a comedian in films. She gave playback singing for Munawwar Sultana for three numbers in Dard, all of which went on to become successful. Her biggest hit was "Afsana Likh Rahi Hoon" picturised on Sultana in the film. The other two solos were "Aaj Machi Hai Dhoom Jhoom Khushi Mein Jhoom" and "Yeh Kaun Chala Yeh Kaun Chala".

Soundtrack
The music director was Naushad with lyrics by Shakeel Badayuni. The singers were Shamshad Begum, Suraiya and Uma Devi.

Song List

References

External links
 
 Dard, full movie on YT

1947 films
1940s Hindi-language films
1947 drama films
Films directed by A. R. Kardar
Films scored by Naushad
Indian drama films
Indian black-and-white films
Hindi-language drama films